U.S. Route 31 (US 31) is a part of the United States Numbered Highway System that runs from Spanish Fort, Alabama, to Mackinaw City, Michigan. In the U.S. state of Tennessee, it runs concurrently with Interstate 65 (I-65) for the first mile northward from the Tennessee state line. There US 31 parallels I-65 to downtown Nashville. At Pulaski US 31 meets the southern terminus of US 31A in Tennessee. US 31 continues due north through Lynnville, Columbia, Spring Hill, Franklin and Brentwood to Nashville. The route splits into US 31E and US 31W in Nashville and go into Kentucky.

Route description

The first mile of US 31 in Tennessee runs concurrently with I-65. At Exit 1 in Ardmore, it leaves I-65 and begins an unsigned concurrency with State Route 7. US 31 then goes through Elkton before going through mainly rural countryside until it has an intersection with US 64 on the outskirts of Pulaski. US 31 gains the name 1st Street through Pulaski; upon leaving Pulaski US 31 meets the southern terminus of US 31A (Grigsby Street). US 31 goes through more rural countryside on its way to Columbia. In Columbia, US 31 picks up the names Carmack Boulevard and Garden Street; it also has a short concurrency with US 412 Business (US 412 Bus.) and intersects the northern terminus of US 43. After leaving Columbia, US 31 gains two designations, first it gains a Tennessee Parkway designation from Columbia to Rosa L. Parks Boulevard in Nashville, and then it picks up the hidden SR 6, which it keeps later as US 31E to the Tennessee state line. US 31 goes through some more rural countryside before meeting the western terminus of SR 396 (Saturn Parkway) in Spring Hill and gains the name 1st Street. After leaving Spring Hill, US 31 has an interchange with I-840. US 31 then continues into Franklin, where US 31 Truck makes a turn to the east onto SR 397 (Mack Hatcher Memorial Parkway), while US 31, erroneously signed here as US 31 Business (which doesn't actually exist and US 31 mainline is signed throughout Franklin), passes north through downtown Franklin. US 31 then has an intersection with mainline US 431 (5th Avenue) before passing through Franklin Square and crossing the Harpeth River to meet SR 397 and the northern end of US 31 Truck. US 31 then goes through the Nasville suburb of Brentwood as Franklin Road. While in Brentwood, US 31 has three important interchanges with SR 441 (Moores Lane), SR 253 (Concord Road) and SR 254 (Old Hickory Boulevard). US 31 next goes through the cities of Oak Hill and Berry Hill, where it has an interchange with SR 155 (Thompson Lane/Woodmount Boulevard), before arriving in Nashville.

US 31 next gains the name 8th Avenue and a while later overlaps US 41 (Lafayette Street), US 70S and US 41A. After going over Broadway (US 70 and US 431), US 31 picks up US 431, loses US 70S and gains the name Rosa L. Parks Boulevard. US 31, US 431 and US 41 and US 41A then go around the Tennessee State Capitol Building and lose US 41A, the Rosa L. Parks name and the Tennessee Parkway designation. US 31, US 431 and US 41 then go over the Cumberland River on the Victory Memorial Bridge. US 31, US 431 and US 41 then have an interchange with I-24. Immediately after the I-24 interchange, US 31E splits off (as Ellington Parkway) from US 31, US 41 US 431 and creating the beginning of the U.S. Route 31E–US 31W split.

US 31E is called Ellington Parkway until its overlap with SR 155 (Briley Parkway) between exits 15 and 14. US 31E then changes names to Johnny Cash Parkway. US 31E then goes through Hendersonville, picks up the name Nashville Pike and has an incomplete interchange with SR 386 (Vietnam Veterans Parkway). US 31E then goes through Gallatin, meets the northern terminus of SR 386 and US 31E Bypass. US 31E then goes through rural countryside, picks up US 231 at Westmoreland. US 31E and US 231 the go through more rural countryside until the Tennessee state border (where the northern terminus of SR 6 is). US 31E and US 231 stay concurrent into Kentucky.

As for US 31W, US 41 and US 431 they change names a total of two times, first from Spring Street to then Dickerson Pike. US 431 leaves the congruence at Trinty Lane, leaving US 31W, US 41 to carry on. US 31W, US 41 then have an incomplete interchange with SR 155 and I-65. US 31W, US 41 split just north of Goodlettsville. US 31W has an interchange with I-65. US 31W the goes through rural countryside until getting to White House. US 31W then goes through more rural countryside until reaching the Tennessee state border, where it crosses in Kentucky.

History

US 31 through Tennessee was one of the original 1926 highways. that was approved on November 11, 1926.

Major intersections

References

31
 Tennessee
Transportation in Giles County, Tennessee
Transportation in Maury County, Tennessee
Transportation in Williamson County, Tennessee
Transportation in Davidson County, Tennessee
Columbia, Tennessee
Franklin, Tennessee
Transportation in Nashville, Tennessee